St. Genevieve High School is a private Roman Catholic high school in Panorama City, Los Angeles, California. It is located in the Roman Catholic Archdiocese of Los Angeles. In 2003, St. Genevieve High School was recognized as a National School of Character by the Character Education Partnership.

See also

Notes and references

External links
 

High schools in the San Fernando Valley
Panorama City, Los Angeles
Roman Catholic secondary schools in Los Angeles County, California
Educational institutions established in 1959
1959 establishments in California
Catholic secondary schools in California